This is a list of the Members of Parliament appointed as Escheator of Ulster, a notional 'office of profit under the crown' which was used at times to resign from the Irish House of Commons.

The office was formerly substantive. It was founded in 1605, when the escheatorship for Ireland was divided among the provinces of Connaught, Leinster, Munster, and Ulster.

Substantive holders
 bef. 1760: John King

Members of the Irish House of Commons
 1799: Luke Fox (Clonmines)
 1799: Charles Ruxton (Ardee)
 1799: Henry Stewart (Longford Borough)
 1799: George Sandford (Roscommon Borough)
 March 1799: Hugh Howard (St Johnstown)
 1800: Theophilus Blakeney (Athenry)
 1800: Sir Richard St George, 2nd Baronet (Athlone)
 1800: Thomas Lindsay (Castlebar)
 1800: Henry Luttrell (Clonmines)
 1800: William Thomas Monsell (Dingle)
 1800: George Bunbury (Gowran)
 1800: Robert Taylour (Kells)
 1800: Charles Silver Oliver (Kilmallock)
 1800: Robert Alexander (Newtownards)
 January 1800: Barry Boyle St Leger (Doneraile)
 February 1800: Robert Johnson (Hillsborough)
 April 1800: Thomas Staples (Knocktopher)
 May 1800: Charles William Stewart (Thomastown)

Members of the United Kingdom House of Commons
 February 1801: William Talbot (Kilkenny City)
 March 1804: John Claudius Beresford (Dublin City)
 February 1819: Richard Nevill (Wexford Borough)

In 1838, all of the Irish escheatorships were abolished by the Lord Lieutenant of Ireland.

Notes

References

See also 
Escheator
Resignation from the British House of Commons

Lists of British people
Government of the United Kingdom
Lists of Irish people
Lists of Irish parliamentarians